"Rub Me Wrong" is a song by Australian drag queen and singer Courtney Act, released on 8 March 2004 as her debut single, shortly after her appearance on season 1 of Australian Idol. The song peaked at number 29 on the Australian ARIA Singles Chart.

Track listings

Charts

References

2004 singles
2004 songs
Courtney Act songs
Sony Music Australia singles